Nasty! is an album by jazz organist Johnny "Hammond" Smith recorded for the Prestige label in 1968. The album is notable as the first recording featuring guitarist John Abercrombie.

Reception

The Allmusic site awarded the album 3 stars stating "in a sense it's run-of-the-mill as far as Prestige late-'60s soul-jazz goes: quite fine grooves, a dependable yet somewhat predictable house sound, and a reliance upon cover versions for much of the material (two-thirds of the songs, in this case). It's solidly executed, though, in a lean fashion that, to its credit, runs counter to the more excessive arrangements that were creeping into soul-jazz around this time".

Track listing
All compositions by Johnny "Hammond" Smith except where noted
 "If I Were a Bell" (Frank Loesser) - 8:39  
 "Song for My Father" (Horace Silver) - 7:18  
 "Speak Low" (Ogden Nash, Kurt Weill) - 6:43  
 "Unchained Melody" (Alex North, Hy Zaret) - 3:48  
 "Nasty" - 9:06  
 "Four Bowls of Soul" - 7:10

Personnel
Johnny "Hammond" Smith - organ
Houston Person - tenor saxophone
John Abercrombie - guitar
Grady Tate - drums

Production
 Cal Lampley - producer
 Rudy Van Gelder - engineer

References

Johnny "Hammond" Smith albums
1968 albums
Prestige Records albums
Albums produced by Cal Lampley
Albums recorded at Van Gelder Studio